North American Aviation (NAA) was a major American aerospace manufacturer that designed and built several notable aircraft and spacecraft. Its products included: the T-6 Texan trainer, the P-51 Mustang fighter, the B-25 Mitchell bomber, the F-86 Sabre jet fighter, the X-15 rocket plane, the XB-70, the B-1 Lancer, the Apollo command and service module, the second stage of the Saturn V rocket, and the Space Shuttle orbiter.

Through a series of mergers and sales, North American Aviation became part of North American Rockwell, which later became Rockwell International, and is now part of Boeing.

History

Early years
On December 6, 1928, Clement Melville Keys founded North American as a holding company that bought and sold interests in various airlines and aviation-related companies. However, the Air Mail Act of 1934 forced the breakup of such holding companies. North American became a manufacturing company, run by James H. "Dutch" Kindelberger, who had been recruited from Douglas Aircraft Company. NAA did retain ownership of Eastern Air Lines until 1938.

In 1933, the General Motors Corporation purchased a controlling interest in NAA, and merged it with the General Aviation Manufacturing Corporation, but retained the name North American Aviation.

Kindelberger moved the company’s operations from Dundalk, Maryland to Los Angeles, California, which allowed flying year-round, and decided to focus on training aircraft, on the theory that it would be easier than trying to compete with established companies on larger projects. NAA’s first planes were the GA-15 observation plane and the GA-16 trainer, followed by the O-47 and BT-9, also called the GA-16.

World War II

The BC-1 of 1937 was North American's first combat aircraft; it was based on the GA-16. In 1940, like other manufacturers, North American started gearing up for war, opening factories in Columbus, Ohio, Dallas, Texas, and Kansas City, Kansas. North American ranked eleventh among United States corporations in the value of wartime production contracts.

North American's follow-on to the BT-9 was the T-6 Texan trainer, of which 17,000 were built, making it the most widely used trainer ever. The twin-engine B-25 Mitchell bomber achieved fame in the Doolittle Raid and was used in all combat theaters of operation. The P-51 Mustang was initially produced for Britain as an alternative to the Curtiss P-40 Warhawk, which North American had declined to produce under licence.  The derivative A-36 Mustang was developed as a ground attack aircraft and dive bomber. This was done, in part, to keep the airframe in production as the US Army Air Corps had not yet decided to purchase the type as a fighter.

A suggestion by the RAF that North American switch the P-51's powerplant from its original Allison engine to the Rolls-Royce Merlin engine may have been one of the most significant events in World War II aviation, as it transformed the P-51 into what many consider to be the best American fighter of the war.

Labor troubles became a grave issue in 1941. During the 22 months from August 1939 to June 1941 Stalin and Hitler supported each other as war raged in Europe. In the U.S., Communist local union officials opposed American aid to Britain's war against Germany.  They called strikes in war industries that were supplying Lend Lease to Britain. The United Auto Workers (UAW) won the election over the International Association of Machinists and represented all the employees at the North American factory in Inglewood, California.  UAW negotiators demanded the starting pay be raised from 50 cents an hour to 75 cents, plus a 10 cents raise for the 11,000 current employees. The national union had made a no-strike pledge but suddenly a wildcat strike by the local on June 5 closed the plant that produced a fourth of the fighters. The UAW national leader Richard Frankensteen flew in but was unable to get the workers to return. So Washington intervened. With the approval of national CIO leadership, President Franklin Roosevelt on June 8 sent in the California national guard to reopen the plant with bayonets.  Strikers were told to return immediately or be drafted into the US Army.  They sullenly complied. However when Germany suddenly invaded the USSR on June 22, the Communist activists suddenly became the strongest supporters of war production; they crushed wildcat strikes.

Post-war years
Post-war, North American's employment dropped from a high of 91,000 to 5,000 in 1946. On V-J Day, North American had orders from the U.S. government for 8,000 aircraft. A few months later, that had dropped to 24.

Two years later in 1948, General Motors divested NAA as a public company. Nevertheless, NAA continued with new designs, including the T-28 Trojan trainer and attack aircraft, the F-82 Twin Mustang fighter, B-45 Tornado jet bomber, the FJ Fury fighter, AJ Savage, the revolutionary XB-70 Valkyrie Mach-3 strategic bomber, Shrike Commander, and T-39 Sabreliner business jet.

The Columbus, Ohio division of North American Aviation was instrumental in the exclusive development and production of the A-5 Vigilante, an advanced high speed bomber that would see significant use as a naval reconnaissance aircraft during the Vietnam War, the OV-10 Bronco, the first aircraft specifically designed for forward air control (FAC), and counter-insurgency (COIN) duties, and the T-2 Buckeye Naval trainer, which would serve from the late 1950s until 2008 and be flown in training by virtually every Naval Aviator and Naval Flight Officer in the US Navy and US Marine Corps for four decades. The Buckeye's name would be an acknowledgment to the state tree of Ohio, as well as the mascot of Ohio State University.

The North American F-86 Sabre started out as a redesigned Fury and achieved fame shooting down MiGs in the Korean War. Over 9,000 F-86s were produced. Its successor, the North American F-100 Super Sabre, was also popular.

Some 6,656 F-86s were produced in the United States, the most produced postwar military aircraft in the West, as well as another 2,500 elsewhere. To accommodate its Sabre production, North American opened facilities in a former Curtiss-Wright plant in Columbus, Ohio. It also moved into a former Consolidated-Vultee Aircraft plant at Downey, California, and in 1948, built a new plant at Downey. By the end of 1952, North American sales topped $315 million. Employment at the Columbus plant grew from 1,600 in 1950 to 18,000 in 1952.

The cancellation of the F-107 and F-108 programs in the late 1950s, as well as the cancellation of the Navaho intercontinental cruise missile program, was a blow to North American from which it never fully recovered.

Nuclear development
Atomics International was a division of North American Aviation which began as the Atomic Energy Research Department at the Downey plant in 1948. In 1955, the department was renamed Atomics International and engaged principally in the early development of nuclear technology and nuclear reactors for both commercial and government applications. Atomics International was responsible for a number of accomplishments relating to nuclear energy: design, construction and operation of the first nuclear reactor in California (a small aqueous homogeneous reactor located at the NAA Downey plant), the first nuclear reactor to produce power for a commercial power grid in the United States (the Sodium Reactor Experiment located at the Santa Susana Field Laboratory) and the first nuclear reactor launched into outer space by the United States (the SNAP-10A). As overall interest in nuclear power declined, Atomics International transitioned to non-nuclear energy-related projects such as coal gasification and gradually ceased designing and testing nuclear reactors. Atomics International was eventually merged with the Rocketdyne division in 1978.

Navigation and guidance, radar, and data systems
Autonetics began in 1945 at North American's Technical Research Laboratory, a small unit in the Los Angeles Division's engineering department based in Downey, California. The evolution of the Navaho missile program resulted in the establishment of Autonetics as a separate division of North American Aviation in 1955, first located in Downey, later moving to Anaheim, California in 1963. The division was involved in the development of guidance systems for the Minuteman ballistic missile system.

Space program

In 1955, the rocket engine operations were spun off into a separate division as Rocketdyne. This division furnished engines for the Redstone, Jupiter, Thor, Delta, and Atlas missiles, and for NASA's Saturn family of launch vehicles.

North American designed and built the airframe for the X-15, a rocket-powered aircraft that first flew in 1959.

In 1959, North American built the first of several Little Joe boosters used to test the launch escape system for the Project Mercury spacecraft. In 1960, the new CEO Lee Atwood decided to focus on the space program, and the company became the prime contractor for the Apollo command and service module, a larger Little Joe II rocket to test Apollo's launch escape system, and the S-II second stage of the Saturn V.

Merger and acquisition
The fatal Apollo 1 fire in January 1967 was partly blamed on the company. In September, it merged with Rockwell-Standard, and the merged company became known as North American Rockwell. During this period the company continued its involvement with the Apollo  program, building the Command and Service modules for all eleven missions. Within two years the new company also was studying concepts for the Space Shuttle, and won the orbiter contract in 1972. In 1973, the company changed its name again to Rockwell International and named its aircraft division North American Aircraft Operations.

Rockwell International's defense and space divisions (including the North American Aviation divisions Autonetics and Rocketdyne) were sold to Boeing in December 1996.  Initially called Boeing North American, these groups were integrated with Boeing's Defense division. Rocketdyne was eventually sold by Boeing to UTC Pratt & Whitney in 2005. UTC later sold Rocketdyne to Aerojet (GenCorp) in 2013.

Products

Aircraft

Crewed spacecraft
Apollo command and service module
North American DC-3
Skylab Rescue
Space Shuttle

Missiles and rockets
AGM-28 Hound Dog
AGM-64 Hornet
RTV-A-3 NATIV
SM-64 Navaho
S-II second stage of the Saturn V launch vehicle
Little Joe (rocket)
Little Joe II

Unmanned aerial vehicles
North American MQM-42 Redhead-Roadrunner

Projects
North American NA-116 (four-engined long range bomber project only)
North American NA-148 (commercial transport project only)
North American NA-237 (fighter bomber project only)
North American NA-323 (project only for VFX F-14 program)
North American NA-365 (carrier on board delivery - project only)
North American NA-400 (naval strike attack project for USN)
North American NA-420 (V/STOL Support aircraft project for USN)
North American NAC-60
North American XF-108 Rapier

See also
 Norris J. Nelson, Los Angeles City Council member, commenting on 1941 North American strike

References

Footnotes

Notes

Bibliography

 Borth, Christy. Masters of Mass Production. Indianapolis, Indiana: Bobbs-Merrill Co., 1945.
 Fletcher, David and Doug MacPhail. Harvard! The North American Trainers in Canada. Dundas, Ontario, Canada: DCF Flying Books, 1990. .
 Fredrickson, John, and James Kindelberger. Warbird Factory: North American Aviation in World War II (Zenith Press, 2015)

 Hagedorn, Dan. North American NA-16/AT-6/SNJ. North Branch, Minnesota: Specialty Press, 1997. 
 Herman, Arthur. Freedom's Forge: How American Business Produced Victory in World War II. New York: Random House, 2012. .
 Parker, Dana T. Building Victory: Aircraft Manufacturing in the Los Angeles Area in World War II. Cypress, California: Dana T. Parker Books, 2013. .
 Pattillo, Donald M. Pushing the Envelope: The American Aircraft Industry. Ann Arbor, Michigan: The University of Michigan Press, 1998.
 Peck, Merton J. and Frederic M. Scherer. The Weapons Acquisition Process: An Economic Analysis. Boston: Harvard Business School, 1962.

Further reading

External links

Boeing.com: North American Aviation history
Aerospace Legacy Foundation
AeroWeb: List of NAA aircraft
ACME, NAA history: documents and photographs archive.
Autonetics division
Bright, Charles D., The Jet Makers: The Aerospace Industry From 1945 to 1972, Lawrence, Kansas: The Regents Press of Kansas, 1978.

 
Defense companies of the United States
Defunct aircraft manufacturers of the United States
Manufacturing companies based in Los Angeles
Technology companies based in Greater Los Angeles
Companies based in Los Angeles County, California
Inglewood, California
American companies established in 1928
Manufacturing companies established in 1928
Technology companies established in 1928
1928 establishments in California
1967 disestablishments in California
Defunct companies based in Greater Los Angeles
Boeing mergers and acquisitions
Eastern Air Lines
Former General Motors subsidiaries
Rocketdyne
History of Southern California
History of the San Fernando Valley